Vlad Dragoș Aicoboae (born 10 October 1993) is a Romanian rower. He competed in the men's coxless four event at the 2016 Summer Olympics.

Career
At the age of 17, he has started canoeing, after he quit handball. 
His first important result with his first international participation.  In 2010, at the World Junior Championships, the four-man squadron crew (Toader-Andrei Gontaru, Marius Vasile Cozmiuc and Cosmin Răzvan Bogus) won the gold medal. In 2011, at the Junior World Championships in Eton, Berkshire, England, the two-man squadron crew won the highest podium rate.

In 2014, the four-man squadron crew consisting of Aicoboae, Gontaru, Cozmiuc and Adrian Damii won the bronze medal at the U23 World Championships held in Varese, Italy. In 2015, at the World Cup, held in Lucerne, Switzerland, the same crew won the third place.

References

External links
 

1993 births
Living people
Romanian male rowers
Olympic rowers of Romania
Rowers at the 2016 Summer Olympics
Rowers at the 2020 Summer Olympics